is a Japanese former professional Nippon Professional Baseball player. He played his entire career for the Saitama Seibu Lions in Japan's Pacific League.

External links

1981 births
Living people
Baseball people from Mie Prefecture
Meiji University alumni
Japanese baseball players
Nippon Professional Baseball pitchers
Seibu Lions players
Saitama Seibu Lions players